Düsseldorf is one of the five Regierungsbezirke of North Rhine-Westphalia, Germany, located in the north-west of the country. It covers the western part of the Ruhr Area, as well as the Niederrheinische Tiefebene, the lower Rhine area. It is the most populated of all German administrative areas of the kind. It is the only area in Germany where the traditional dialects are Low Franconian, rather than Low German or High German.

It was created as a subdivision of the Prussian Rhineland when Prussia reformed its internal administration in 1815. In 1822 the Regierungsbezirk Kleve was incorporated into Regierungbezirk Düsseldorf.

Its highest point is the Brodtberg (378 m).

Economy 
The Gross domestic product (GDP) of the region was 215.7 billion € in 2018, accounting for 6.4% of German economic output. GDP per capita adjusted for purchasing power was 38,100 € or 126% of the EU27 average in the same year. The GDP per employee was 108% of the EU average.

References

External links 
Official website

Government regions of Germany
Government regions of Prussia
NUTS 2 statistical regions of the European Union
Geography of North Rhine-Westphalia
States and territories established in 1815
Rhineland
1815 establishments in Prussia